Rajya Sabha elections were held on various dates in 1979, to elect members of the Rajya Sabha, Indian Parliament's upper chamber.

Elections
Elections were held to elect members from various states.

Members elected
The following members are elected in the elections held in 1979. They are members for the term 1979-1985 and retire in year 1985, except in case of the resignation or death before the term.
The list is incomplete.

State - Member - Party

Bye-elections
The following bye elections were held in the year 1979.

State - Member - Party

 Bihar  - Syed Shahabuddin  - JAN ( ele  25/07/1979 term till 1984 )
 Bihar  - Brahmdeo Ram Shastri  - JAN ( ele  25/07/1979 term till 1980 )

References

1979 elections in India
1979